Pseudopalaina polymorpha is a species of small land snail with an operculum, a terrestrial gastropod mollusk in the family Diplommatinidae. This species is endemic to Palau.

References

Fauna of Palau
Pseudopalaina
Endemic fauna of Palau
Taxonomy articles created by Polbot